The 2005 San Marino GP2 round was a GP2 Series motor race held on 23 April and 24 April 2005 at the Autodromo Enzo e Dino Ferrari in Imola, Italy. It was the first race of the 2005 GP2 Series season. The race was used to support the 2005 San Marino Grand Prix.

The first race was won by Heikki Kovalainen for Arden International, with José María López second for DAMS and Scott Speed finishing third for iSport International. Polesitter Nicolas Lapierre did not start.

The second race was won by Adam Carroll for Super Nova Racing, with Alexandre Prémat for ART Grand Prix and Heikki Kovalainen also on the podium.

Classification

Qualifying

Race 1

Race 2

Standings after the round

Drivers' Championship standings

Teams' Championship standings

 Note: Only the top five positions are included for both sets of standings.

References

External links
 GPUpdate.net
 official site

Imola Gp2 Round, 2005
Imola